Lombard is a surname. Notable people with the surname include:

Adrian Lombard (1915–1967), British aeronautical engineer
Alain Lombard, French conductor
Alvin Orlando Lombard (1856–1937), American inventor of the continuous track vehicle
André Lombard, Swiss chess player
Anthony Lombard, former Mayor of Gibraltar
Carole Lombard (1908–1942), Hollywood actress
Claude Lombard (1945–2021), Belgian singer
Denys Lombard, scholar
Didier Lombard, French businessman
Émile Lombard (painter)
Émile Lombard (biblical scholar)
Émile Lombard (cyclist)
Étienne Lombard (1869–1920), French otolaryngologist known for discovering the Lombard effect
Fleur Lombard, firefighter 
George Lombard (born 1975), Major League Baseball player
Gustav Lombard (1895–1992), German General of the Waffen SS
Héctor Lombard (born 1978), mixed martial arts fighter
Henri-Édouard Lombard (1855-1929), French sculptor
Jean Lombard, French novelist
Jim Lombard, Florida politician
John Lombard, football coach
Karina Lombard, French-American actress
Lambert Lombard (1505–1566), Flemish Renaissance architect
Louise Lombard (born 1970 Louise Maria Perkins), British actress
Marc Lombard, a Scouting leader
Montserrat Lombard (born 1982), British actress
Olivier Lombard, French racing driver
Peter Lombard (archbishop of Armagh) (c. 1555–1625)
Peter Lombard (c. 1100–1160), scholastic philosopher and bishop
Robert Lombard, Apostolic clergyman
Sébastien Lombard, French football player
Thomas Lombard, French rugby player
Yvonne Lombard (born 1929), Swedish actress known from the film A Lesson in Love

See also
Lumbard, another surname

Afrikaans-language surnames
Ethnonymic surnames